Propebela margaritae is a species of sea snail, a marine gastropod mollusk in the family Mangeliidae.

Description
The length of the shell varies between 5.5 mm and 12.5 mm.

Distribution
This marine species occurs off Bering Island.

References

 Bogdanov, IP. "New Species of Gastropods of the genus Oenopotina (Gastropoda, Turridae) from the Far-East Seas of the USSR." Zoologichesky Zhurnal 64.3 (1985): 448–453.

External links
 

margaritae
Gastropods described in 1985